Oxalis norlindiana is a species of plant in the family Oxalidaceae. It is endemic to Ecuador.

References

norlindiana
Endemic flora of Ecuador
Critically endangered flora of South America
Taxonomy articles created by Polbot